John Slater (born May 1795) was an English professional cricketer who played first-class cricket from 1825 to 1829.  He was mainly associated with Sussex and made seven known appearances in first-class matches.

References

1795 births
Date of death unknown
English cricketers
English cricketers of 1787 to 1825
English cricketers of 1826 to 1863
Sussex cricketers
Year of death missing
Left-Handed v Right-Handed cricketers
People from Storrington